Verona Porta Vescovo is a railway station serving the city of Verona, in the region of Veneto, northern Italy. The station opened in 1847 and is located on the Milan–Venice railway. The train services are operated by  Trenitalia.

Porta Vescovo is the lesser of the two stations that serve Verona. It lies outside the 19th-century Habsburg city fortifications, a short distance from the eponymous city gate and a thirty-minute walk from the city centre. At one time, the station served the important military garrison and it was the major railway station for Verona. This changed as Porta Nuova station, south of the city was opened (in 1913) and developed into a major hub.

The station has a magazine stall and cafe, from where tickets are issued.

Train services
The station is served by the following services:

Express services (Regionale Veloce) Verona - Vicenza - Padua - Venice
Express services ( Regionale Veloce )  Verona - Vicenza - Padua - Venice 
Regional services (Treno regionale) Verona - Vicenza - Padua - Venice

See also

History of rail transport in Italy
List of railway stations in Veneto
Rail transport in Italy
Railway stations in Italy

References

 This article is based upon a translation of the Italian language version as of January 2016.

External links

Railway stations in Veneto
Buildings and structures in Verona